= 1962–63 Plunket Shield season =

Cricket tournament in New Zealand

1962–63 Plunket Shield
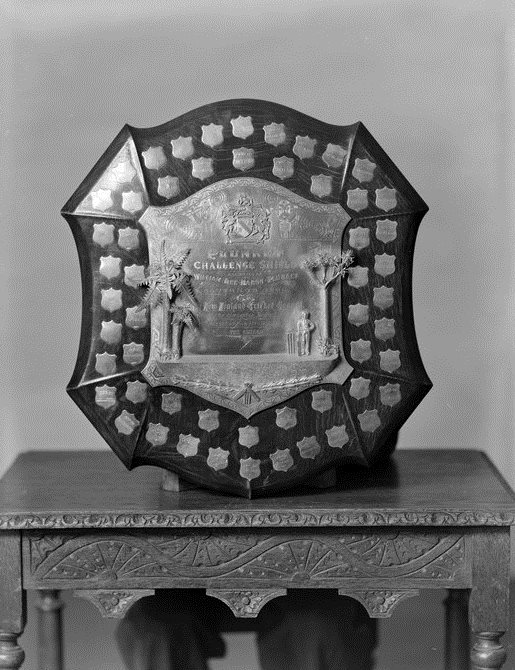
- The Plunket Shield trophy
- Cricket format: First-class
- Tournament format(s): Round-robin
- Champions: Northern Districts (1st title)
- Participants: 6
- Matches: 15

The 1962–63 Plunket Shield season was a tournament of the Plunket Shield, the domestic first-class cricket competition of New Zealand.

Northern Districts won the championship, finishing at the top of the points table at the end of the round-robin tournament between the six first-class sides, Auckland, Canterbury, Central Districts, Northern Districts, Otago and Wellington. Ten points were awarded for a win, five points for having a first innings lead in a draw, three points for having a first innings lead in a loss and one point for a first innings deficit in a draw.

== Table ==
Below are the Plunket Shield standings for the season:

Team	Played	Won	Lost	Drawn	Points	Net RpW
Northern Districts	5	3	1	1	35	0.790
Wellington	5	2	1	2	30	7.702
Auckland	5	1	0	4	22	6.003
Canterbury	5	2	1	2	22	2.886
Central Districts	5	1	1	3	20	−2.103
Otago	5	0	5	0	0	−11.807
